The Cymbrian flood (or Cimbrian flood) was, according to certain Roman accounts, a large-scale incursion of the sea in the region of the Jutland peninsula in the period 120 to 114 BCE, resulting in a permanent alteration of the coastline with much land lost.

Supposedly as a result of this flood, the Cimbri migrated south and, together with the Ambrones and Teutons, came into conflict with the Romans, precipitating the Cimbrian War (113 to 101 BCE). The contemporary Greek geographer Strabo, though sceptical, describes the flood and its consequences thus:

Researchers such as Jürgen Spanuth (1907–1998) have sought to push back the date of the Cymbrian flood by more than a millennium, severing its historical links with the wanderings of the Cimbri and Teutons and linking it instead with the Invasions of the Sea Peoples of the late 13th and early 12th centuries BCE, driven from their northern homelands to attack the settled kingdoms of the Mediterranean.

References

Floods in Europe
2nd century BC
Storm tides of the North Sea
Ancient natural disasters
1st-millennium BC natural events
110s BC
Floods in Denmark
Jutland